Gauripur Railway Station is a railway station on the Fakiragram–Dhubri branch line and the New Cooch Behar–Golakganj branch line. It is located in Dhubri district in the Indian state of Assam. This station serves the Gauripur town. It falls under Alipurduar railway division of Northeast Frontier Railway zone.

References

Railway stations in Dhubri district
Alipurduar railway division